Sophie Ash (born 7 November 1996) is an Australian freestyle skier. She competed in the 2022 Winter Olympics.

Career
Ash placed fifth in moguls and seventh in dual moguls at the 2017 Asian Winter Games. She finished 16th out of 20 competitors in the first final round in the women's moguls event at the 2022 Winter Olympics.

Personal life
Ash attended the Victorian College of the Arts Secondary School and the Victorian College of the Arts, where she received a degree in animation. She released a film describing her experiences in international skiing competitions, "Start Gate", in 2019. Her sister Gabi is also a freestyle skier and competed at the 2022 Winter Olympics.

References

1996 births
Living people
Freestyle skiers at the 2022 Winter Olympics
Australian female freestyle skiers
Olympic freestyle skiers of Australia
Sportspeople from Brisbane
Sportspeople from Melbourne
Freestyle skiers at the 2017 Asian Winter Games